Bringing Home the Body of King Charles XII is a painting by Swedish artist Gustaf Cederström, painted in Paris in 1878, displayed at Gothenburg Museum of Art. 
The author painted a second version in 1884, which is now on display in the National Museum in Stockholm. The scene depicts the repatriation of the body of Charles XII of Sweden, who was killed in Norway during the Siege of Fredriksten.

History 
The work was conceived to participate in the Exposition Universelle in Paris in May 1878. Cederström was a great admirer of Charles XII and decided to take him as the subject of the work. He had moved to Paris years earlier to study under master Léon Bonnat, who was initially sceptical about his pupil's chosen subject but later, seeing his enthusiasm, encouraged him to try, while warning him not to expect a positive response from the critics:

 

Cederström was therefore determined to make the painting as realistic as possible. He made numerous preliminary sketches (now in the Östergötlands Museum in the city of Linköping) and spared no expense in recreating the scene live before depicting it: he bought a huge amount of salt to simulate snow (otherwise unavailable in Paris in May), had a stretcher built for the model of the king to lie on and also had specially ordered uniforms to be sent from Sweden for the models of the soldiers to wear. The remaining figures not represented by human models were crafted in wax by Cederström himself. During his work, he felt discouraged several times, both by his teacher's warning and by the negative outcome of his previous painting titled Albert of Mecklenburg mocked by Queen Margaret, which received much criticism. 

When the painting was acquired and viewed by the gallery before the exhibition opened to the public, he marked this moment in his diary:

Contrary to the author's expectations, however, the work was appreciated so much that the artist was awarded the second place medal, thanks to which he was made famous throughout Europe. After the exhibition was over, the painting was bought for 22000 francs by the Grand Duke Konstantin Konstantinovich of Russia, who took it to his home in Saint Petersburg, the Marble Palace. Shortly after, Cederström also received news that his wife gave birth to their daughter. As proof of his admiration for the portrayed king, he named her Carola in his honour. We still read in his diaries:

The painting depicts an extremely important moment in Swedish history, both geopolitically and emotionally. The death of Charles XII marked the end of the Great Northern War, the decline of Sweden as a great European power and the beginning of the Age of Liberty. For these reasons, many of Cederström's compatriots were outraged by the news that the painting had been bought by a Russian, considering it a disgrace that the funerary tribute to the warrior king had ended up in the enemy country he had fought against. To convince the author to paint a new version, his admirers organised a fund-raising campaign that raised 11000 kronas. Cederström was still in Paris when he accepted this commission. He immediately started to work based on sketches of the original painting. He continued it in Florence, where he stayed for a short time, and finished it at home, in his house in Krusenberg, just south of Uppsala. On 30th November 1884, the anniversary of the death of Charles XII, he signed the canvas and delivered it to the museum in Stockholm.As for the original, it is unclear how it survived the upheavals of the October Revolution, but in 1923 the art dealer Max Molvidson managed to buy it for 7500 roubles and bring it back to Sweden. He then sold it to Gustaf Werner, who subsequently donated it to the Gothenburg Museum of Art in 1939, where it is still exhibited today.

Style 
Realist only in intentions and pictorial technique, the painting is actually the result of a highly fictionalised interpretation of the events. In fact, the king was not repatriated in broad daylight on an open stretcher but at night to the camp in Tistedalen and from there in a pine coffin to Uddevalla, where he was embalmed. The most likely route would have been either the one that corresponds to today's state road 220 in Norway (which from the Swedish border is called state road 165) or the state road 884 (which later becomes state road 166 in Sweden). Since both routes are rather flat, the mountains in the background are a very loose reinterpretation of the landscape. This choice was inspired by the Catastrophe on Øyfjellet (also known as the Carolean Death March), in which 3000 soldiers of the contingent led by Carl Gustaf Armfeldt froze to death, caught in a blizzard on their way back home through the northern part of the Sylan mountains in the Tydal region. Cederström was well aware that he had taken such artistic liberties and in 1919 responded to the criticism by commenting:

Differences between the two versions 

Those who posed as models were always hired locally for obvious practical reasons. The first version was painted entirely in Paris, the models were therefore all French. The second version, on the other hand, was started in France but continued in Italy and finished in Sweden with Swedish models, which is why many characters have lighter hair and eyes than their Parisian counterparts.

Moreover, in the second version, Cederström also decided to portray his friends and relatives. The king is represented by Raffaele Fusco (the only Italian among all the models), the soldier with the bandaged head has the face of Carl Cedeström while the little girl next to the hunter has that of Carola Cedeström, respectively the author's elder brother and daughter. The soldier at the head of the procession has the face of Gustaf Cederström himself in both versions.

References

Further reading 
 
 Kristoffer Arvidsson, Per Dahlström, Björn Fredlund, Anna Hyltze, Philippa Nanfeldt, Isabella Nilsson, Johan Sjöström, Samlingen Göteborgs konstmuseum, Gothenburg, 2014 pages 122-125, ISBN 978-91-87968-83-9.
 Axel L. Romdahl, Konstmonologer i Göteborgs Museum, P. A. Norstedt & Söners Förlag, Stockholm 1921, page 59.
 Kristoffer Arvidsson, Tomas Björk, Maria Görts e altri, En målad historia. Svenskt historiemåleri under 1800-talet, Gothenburg 2014, pages 11, 21, 29, 35-37, 52, 68-69, 86, 90-97, 107-119, 165, ISBN 978-91-87968-86-0.
 Georg Pauli, I vår ungdom, Albert Bonniers förlag, Stockholm 1925, pages 131, 135.
 Georg Nordensvan, Svensk konst och svenska konstnärer i nittonde århundradet. II. Från Karl XV till sekelslutet, Ny, grundligt omarbetad upplaga, Albert Bonniers Förlag, Stockholm 1928, pages 210-211, 222-223.
 Sten Åke Nilsson, Vinter i den svenska historien - Trädgårdarna i Kashmir och andra essäer, Atlantis, Stockholm 2014, pages 116-121, ISBN 978-91-73536-73-8.
 Prins Eugen, Breven berätta. Upplevelser och iakttagelser åren 1886–1913, P. A. Norstedt & Söners Förlag, Stockholm 1942, page 175.
 Sixten Strömbom, Konstnärsförbundets historia till och med 1890, Albert Bonniers förlag, Stockholm 1945, pages 118, 120-121, 333.
 Einar Rosenborg, Svenska konstnärer 2. Anders Zorn, prins Eugen, Gustaf Cederström, Carl Milles, J. A. Lindblads förlag, Uppsala 1911, pages 46-48, 54.
 Sven Sandström, Konsten i Sverige. Det sena 1800-talet – bildkonst och miljökonst, Almqvist & Wiksell Förlag AB, Stockholm 1975, pages 48-49, ISBN 9120039751.
 Bengt Järbe, Sällsamheter i Uppland, vol. 2, Stockholm, Rabén & Sjögren, 1979, pages 295-297, ISBN 9129528194

See also 
 History painting

External links 
 Dedicated page on Gothenburg museum's website
 Dedicated page on Stockholm museum's website

Paintings in the collection of the Nationalmuseum Stockholm
1878 paintings
1884 paintings
History paintings